Judit Reigl (née Némedy; 1 May 1923 – 6 August 2020) was a Hungarian painter who lived in France.

Biography 
Reigl attended the Hungarian University of Fine Arts from 1942 to 1945 where she was the student of the celebrated painter István Szőnyi. She was awarded a scholarship from the Academy of Hungary in Rome which allowed her to study in Italy between 1947 and 1948. During her studies there she encountered Byzantine icons, the mosaics of Ravenna, the works of Giotto and Masaccio and the paintings of Venice's Giorgione and Titian amongst others.

In 1950, when the Iron Curtain had divided Hungary and Western Europe, Reigl succeeded in crossing into Western Europe after eight previous attempts. She explained that her home country of Hungary solely commissioned her to paint portraits of ruling Communist leaders such as Stalin, Rákosi and Gerő, and so her defection to the West was necessary to preserve her artistic freedom. Reigl eventually reached Paris by crossing through Austria, Switzerland, Germany and Belgium where she lived from 1950 to 1963. In 1963 she moved to Marcoussis (Île-de-France).

Influences and impact 
Four years after arriving in Paris, in May 1945, Simon Hantaï, a fellow Hungarian émigré, introduced Reigl to André Breton. Known as the Pope of Surrealism, Breton welcomed Reigl into his circle of Surrealist artists and their influence is evident in her early work. She read authors such as Le Comte de Lautréamont and Arthur Rimbaud, whose texts were seminal for the Surrealists. Breton was impressed with Reigl’s art, and one of her most important pieces, They Have an INsatiable THirst for Infinity, particularly stood out. Reigl was interested in Surrealism and Andre Breton because of her interest in automatic writing. After being introduced to one another, Riegl soon started to spend time with the surrealists.  Reigi had a relatively short phase of focusing on surrealism but she would become an important bridge between surrealists and the younger generation of artists that would be associated with lyrical abstraction in the future. Reigi would soon be known for pushing the practice of automatism in surrealism by constantly striving for a level of absolute automatism, both psychologically and physically. Reigi talked about her experiences with automatism and stated "My entire body took part in the work, in the wake of my arms wide open. I wrote in the given space with gestures, beats, impulses". Reigl eventually moved away from Surrealism and towards Lyrical Abstraction. Georges Mathieu, one of the greatest French Lyrical Abstractionists, was one of Reigl's significant influences during this period. Both series garnered Reigl much success in France as well as in West Germany and in the United States, where she familiarized herself with the American Abstract Expressionists such as Jackson Pollock, Willem de Kooning and Franz Kline.

Reigl exhibited her work in France beginning in 1954. For her first exhibition, the prologue to the catalogue was written by André Breton. Her works are primarily found in the collections of French museums, including the Musée d'Art Moderne de la Ville de Paris, Musée National d'Art Moderne and Musée de Grenoble. Her works were only displayed in Hungary starting in the mid-2000s.

Artwork 
Reigl's early works from her Surrealist period combine elements of photo collage with a mixture of figurative and more abstract elements (Incomparable Pleasure, 1952–53). She later expanded her use of collages from 1953 to 1955 using images from popular magazines and newspapers. Although these smaller photo collages weren't included in her inaugural exhibition at André Breton’s galerie À l'Étoile scellée, they still align with the Surrealist movement through their bizarre juxtapositions, dreamlike scenarios and transfigured bodies. Most of her paintings which were included in the show at galerie À l'Étoile scellée are more abstract, the exhibited canvases were Reigl's first experimentation with automatic writing, a technique that recurs in various forms throughout her oeuvre. Reigl's automatism arode from instinctive gestures of her body and showcases movement, levitation, tension and changes in processes, rhythms and roots of existence on spectacular large canvases. Figurative- and non-figurative representation was for her a question of encoding and de-coding but may also be anthropomorphic.

Reigl used her body as her primary instrument when creating the series Outburst (Éclatement) which she began in 1955. The Outbursts series is different from her earlier paintings with automatic writing in that they no longer used improvised metal tools to make spontaneous gestural marks. She began with throwing thick industrial pigment mixed with linseed oil onto the canvas with her hands and continued by vigorously scraping it from the center to the edges with a tool. In a 1956 Outburst in the collection of the Solomon R. Guggenheim Museum, the relatively spare composition is punctuated by thick impastos or forceful marks. The artist later explained this time in her life as a transitional period when she severed her ties with the Surrealists. The Outbursts are explosions of mass, radiating from a center as bursts of pure energy.

For her following series Mass Writing (Écriture en masse), Reigl applied large volumes of thick, slow-drying black pigment to the canvas using a blade or a stick, and then painted with upward strokes. In these works, the black areas are dispersed outward toward the edges of the canvas. While working on these canvases, Reigl inadvertently began in 1958 working on an innovative oeuvre of paintings called Guanos, in which she reworked rejected canvases that had been covering the floor of her studio. The textured surface of these paintings evoke the archeological which was further affirmed by the artist herself when she referred to the canvases becoming "fertile ground" for new paintings.

Some of her subsequent series include Man, Drap/décodage and Facing... (Face à...). They display Reigl's desire for liberation from her own body by investigating the human figure. Other Reigl series such as Writings after Music (Écritures d'après musique) and Unfolding (Déroulement) are based around the central theme of music. In Writings after Music, she transcribes musical notes into concrete visual signs. Scholars characterize the creative process of Unfolding as a type of dance in which the artist develops a unique form of visual calligraphy by combining gesture and innovative painting techniques.

Exhibitions (selection) 

Solo exhibitions
 1954 • Galerie l'Étoile Scellée, Paris
 1956 • Galerie Kléber, Paris
 1958 • Galerie Van de Loo, Munich • Gallery Drian, London
 1959, 1962 • Galerie Kléber, Paris
 1960 • Galerie Van de Loo, Essen, Germany
 1961 • Kunstverein, Freiburg im Breisgau, Germany
 1966 • Galerie Van de Loo, Munich
 1972 • Rétrospective 1952-1972, M. J. C. de la Vallée de Chevreuse, Bures-sur-Yvette • Rétrospective 1952-1972, I. N. P. E., Marly le Roi • Galerie Rencontres, Paris
 1973 • Galerie Rencontres, Paris
 1974 • Galerie Rencontres, Paris Maison de la Culture, Rennes, France
 1975 • Galerie Rencontres, Paris
 1976 • Galerie Rencontres, Paris • A.R.C. 2, Musée d'Art Moderne de la Ville de Paris
 1978 • Galerie Yvon Lambert, Paris • Musée de Peinture, Grenoble, France
 1979, 1981 • Galerie Jolliet, Québec
 1980 • Galerie Yvon Lambert, Paris
 1982, 1984 • Galerie Jolliet, Montreal • Galerie de France, Paris
 1985 • Galerie de France, Paris • Musée d'Evreux, Ancien Evechê, France
 1989 • Centre d'Arts Contemporains, Orléans
 1989–1990 • FRAC Auvergne, Clermont-Ferrand, France
 1992 • Musée de Brou, Bourg-en-Bresse, France • Galerie de France, Paris
 1994 • Donation Goreli, Musée National d'Art Moderne, Paris
 2001 • Musée de Brou, Bourg-en-Bresse, France
 2005 • Reigl, Múcsarnok Kunsthalle, Budapest
 2013 • Entrée - Sortie, W&K Wienerroither & Kohlbacher, Vienna
 2013 • Entrance - Exit (1986–89), Shepherd W&K Galleries, New York
 2014 • Emptiness and Ecstasy (artist’s title: Void and Space), Ludwig Museum of Contemporary Art, Budapest
 2016 • Body of Music, Allen Memorial Art Museum, Oberlin, USA
 2018 • Dance of Death, Shepherd W&K Galleries, New York
 2018 • Late Works, Janos Gat Gallery, NY at Prisme, Paris

Group exhibitions
 1944 • VII. Nemzeti Képzőművészeti Kiállítás, Hall of Art, Budapest
 1947 • Hungarian Academy, Rome
 1948 • Mostra de Pittura e Scultura Ungherese Contemporanea, Catania, Italy
 1956 • Cinq oeuvres nouvelles Galerie René Drouin, Paris
 1957, 1958 • Galerie Kléber, Paris
 1960 • Form, Struktur, Bedeutung, Städtisches Galerie, Munich
 1963 • Musée des Beaux-Arts, Lausanne, Switzerland
 1964 • Guggenheim International Award, Solomon R. Guggenheim Museum, New York
 1966 • Salon de Mai, Paris
 1967–1968 • Museum of Arts, Carnegie Foundation, Pittsburgh
 1969 • L'oeil écoute. Exposition Internationale d'Art Contemporain, Palais des Papes, Avignon, France
 1970 • Un art subjectif, Centre d'Art Contemporain de l'Abbaye de Beaulieu, Beaulieu, France
 1972 • Six from Europe, Phoenix Gallery, Pittsburgh
 1973 • l'Espace lyrique, Centre d'Art Contemporaine de Beaulieu, Beaulieu, France
 1974–1975 • Galerie Rencontres, Paris
 1976 • Art Contemporaine 2, Musée d'Art Moderne, Paris
 1977 • 3 collections... 3 villes • l'avant-garde 1960-1976, Musée Cantini Marseille, France
 1978 • Galerie Yvon Lambert, Paris • Aspects de l'art en France, Art 9'78, Basel
 1979 • Tendances de l'art en France, A.R.C, Musée d'Art Moderne de la Ville de Paris, Paris
 1981 • Bram van Velde, Simon Hantaϊ, Judith Reigl..., M. Sainte-Croix, Poitiers, France
 1982 • The subject of painting, Museum of Modern Art, Oxford • Tisztelet a szülőföldnek. Külföldön élő magyar származású művészek II. kiállítása, Hall of Art, Budapest
 1983–1984 • Vingt ans d'art en France 1960-1980, Mittelrheinische Landesmuseum, Mainz, Germany
 1984 • Nouvelles acquisitions pour le Musée de Picardie, Musée d'Amiens, Amiens, France
 1985 • Acquisitions 49 et autres pièces, Galerie Nationale, Beauvais, France
 1988 • Art pour l'Afrique, Musée des Arts Africains et Océaniens, Paris
 1989 • Art Abstrait 1970-1987, Galerie Maeght, Paris • I surrealisti, Palazzo Reale, Milan
 1990 • Stirn Kunsthalle am Römerberg, Frankfurt am Main
 1991 • André Breton, Musée National d'Art Moderne, Paris
 1992 • Art expérimental en Europe 1946-1956, Musée d'Art Contemporain, Las Palmas • Francia kortárs művészet, Hungarian National Gallery, Budapest
 1993 • Peinture en France 1960-1980, Musée d'Art Contemporain, Toulouse. France
 1995 • G. Maeght, Barcelona
 1996 • La dimension du corps, National Museum of Modern Art, Tokyo
 1997 • Made in France 1947-1997, Musée National d'Art Moderne, Paris
 1997–1998 • Abstraction en France 1940-1965, Collection du Centre Georges Pompidou, Colmar, France
 2001 • D'Alechinsky à Zao Wou ki, Centre Georges Pompidou, Paris
 2011 • Surrealism: The Poetry of Dreams, Queensland Art Gallery | Gallery of Modern Art, Brisbane
 2012 • 4ème rotation – Vitrines et niches (collections modernes), Musée national d’art moderne, Centre Georges Pompidou, Paris
 2014 • International Abstraction, 1949–1960, Kobra Museum for Modern Art, Amstelveen
 2018 • Epic Abstraction: Pollock to Herrera, The Metropolitan Museum of Art, New York

Awards 
 Guggenheim International Award (New York City, 1964)
 Carnegie Award (Pittsburgh, 1967–68)
 Commander's Cross of Order of Merit of the Republic of Hungary (Budapest, 2008)
 Kossuth Prize (Budapest, 2011)

References 

1923 births
2020 deaths
20th-century Hungarian painters
20th-century Hungarian women artists
21st-century Hungarian painters
21st-century Hungarian women artists
Commandeurs of the Ordre des Arts et des Lettres
Hungarian expatriates in France
Hungarian University of Fine Arts alumni
Hungarian women painters
Knights of the Ordre national du Mérite